Molodilovo is a rural locality (a village) in Petushinskoye Rural Settlement, Petushinsky District, Vladimir Oblast, Russia. The population was 83 as of 2010. There are 3 streets.

Geography 
Molodilovo is located 5 km east of Petushki (the district's administrative centre) by road. Petushki is the nearest rural locality.

References 

Rural localities in Petushinsky District